The Wizard of Lies is a 2017 American television biopic film directed by Barry Levinson and written by Sam Levinson, Sam Baum, and John Burnham Schwartz, based on the 2011 non-fiction book of the same name by Diana B. Henriques. The film stars Robert De Niro as businessman and fraudster Bernie Madoff, Michelle Pfeiffer as his wife Ruth Madoff, and Alessandro Nivola as their older son Mark Madoff. It aired on HBO on May 20, 2017.

Plot
Bernard Madoff founded his company on Wall Street in the early 1960s, which, over time, turned into one of the largest investment funds. Madoff had enjoyed a reputation as a successful and influential financier, broker, financial consultant, and generous philanthropist. He employs his sons, Mark and Andrew, and his wife, Ruth. In 2008, it became known that, over the past 16 years, his firm had run the largest Ponzi scheme in history. The resulting scandal lead to multibillion-dollar losses and the arrest of Madoff, who was later sentenced to 150 years in prison.

Lawyer Martin London, Mark Madoff's father-in-law, advises Bernie Madoff's sons to turn their father to the authorities.

Bernie Madoff admits to FBI agents that he had been operating a Ponzi scheme since the 1970s. In 2000, Harry Markopolos testified before the US House that he believed the Madoff's company was a fraudulent Ponzi scheme because the company's gains never fluctuated up and down.

In 2005, Madoff does not want to give investigators his Depository Trust Company (DTC) account number but complies with their request in an unsuspecting manner. Madoff explains that all the SEC had to do was to make a call to DTC to verify the supposed assets of his advisory business and they would have realised right there and then that there were in fact no assets held in the firm's DTC account and the entire operation was a fraud.  No phone call from the SEC to DTC was made.

By the start of the 2008 Great Recession in the United States, numerous clients start pouring into Madoff's firm to withdraw their money. Madoff does not have the money to return, however, and realizes that his fraud will inevitably be exposed. He tells his wife and sons about the Ponzi scheme, and his sons are left with no choice but to turn him in. Madoff and his wife attempt suicide, but are rescued by police.

Clawback suits are filed against Madoff's sons. Mark Madoff commits suicide, while Andrew dies of cancer. Before the latter's death, he says, "My father is dead to me." Ruth divorces Madoff and blames him for Mark's death. While talking with a journalist in prison, Madoff refuses to take responsibility for ruining his victims' lives, even blaming them for "letting" him take advantage of them. He then asks, "Am I a sociopath?"

Cast

 Robert De Niro as Bernard Madoff
 Michelle Pfeiffer as Ruth Madoff
 Alessandro Nivola as Mark Madoff
 Hank Azaria as Frank DiPascali
 Nathan Darrow as Andrew Madoff
 Sydney Gayle as Emily Madoff
 Lily Rabe as Catherine Hooper
 Kristen Connolly as Stephanie Madoff
 Kathrine Narducci as Eleanor Squillari
 Steve Coulter as Martin London
 Shivam Chopra as Male Student
 Michael Kostroff as Peter Madoff
 Clem Cheung as Denny Chin
 Diana B. Henriques as Herself
 Ben Hammer as Carl J. Shapiro
 Matt Fischel as Jeffry Picower

Production
On August 27, 2015 Michelle Pfeiffer and Alessandro Nivola joined the film to play wife Ruth Madoff and older son Mark Madoff, respectively. On September 9, 2015 Hank Azaria joined the film as Frank DiPascali. On September 10, 2015 Nathan Darrow, Kristen Connolly, Kathrine Narducci, and Steve Coulter were cast as Andrew Madoff, Stephanie Madoff, Eleanor Squillari, and Martin London, respectively. Diana B. Henriques was also cast as herself. On 11 September 2015, Lily Rabe was cast as Catherine Hooper.

Principal photography on the film began on August 31, 2015, in New York City.

John Burnham Schwartz, Sam Baum and Sam Levinson were credited as the film's writers.  Diana Henriques’s The Wizard of Lies: Bernie Madoff and The Death of Trust, and Laurie Sandell’s Truth and Consequences: Life Inside the Madoff Family were credited as additional source material.

Reception

Critical response
On Rotten Tomatoes, the film has a rating of 73%, based on 52 reviews, with a weighted average rating of 6.5/10. The site's critical consensus reads, "The Wizard of Lies doesn't really shed much new light on its fact-based story, but thanks to solid direction and a talented cast, it still proves consistently watchable." On Metacritic, the film has a score of 67 out of 100, based on 26 critics, indicating "favorable reviews". The film has a three-star rating on the Roger Ebert website, with the reviewer praising De Niro's performance.

Ratings
The film's premiere drew 1.5 million viewers, making it HBO's largest premiere viewership for an HBO film in four years; additional replays and viewings through the network's streaming service brought the film's total viewers to 2.4 million for its premiere weekend.

Awards and nominations

Soundtrack

The Wizard of Lies (Music from the HBO Film) was released digitally May 19, 2017, the day before the film's premiere.

See also
Madoff (miniseries)
Pyramid scheme

References

External links
 

2017 television films
2017 films
2017 biographical drama films
2010s American films
2010s English-language films
American biographical drama films
Films directed by Barry Levinson
Films based on non-fiction books
Films set in the Great Recession
Films about businesspeople
Films shot in New York City
Films produced by Robert De Niro
Films about con artists
HBO Films films
Drama films based on actual events
Biographical films about fraudsters
Cultural depictions of Bernie Madoff
Madoff investment scandal